Gattu Battu is an Indian animated television series produced by Toonz Animation,Green Gold Animation, symbiosis, Hi-tech Animation, Studio 56, 88 Pictures and irealities. Its first season aired the on Nickelodeon India and Nickelodeon Sonic, premiering on 1 May 2017. Viacom18 is the  distributor. Nickelodeon Sonic aired a few episodes and the show moved to Nickelodeon which aired the remaining episodes. The show paused in August 2020. It came back to Nickelodeon Sonic on 25 July 2022 after a 2 year hiatus.

Characters
Many of the characters of this show are similar to the characters of Motu Patlu.

Main 
Gattu is a 21 year old, red shirted man who, along with Battu, is a main character. Both fight criminals. He likes carrots and is usually treated as the smarter of the two. He's similar to Motu.
 Battu is a 21 year old, blue shirted man who, along with Gattu, is a main character. He is shown as a sweet-hearted idiot. He is voiced by Sartaj Sarvar in mimicry of Aamir Khan. He's similar to Patlu.
 Inspector Manmani is the village inspector. He detests Gattu and Battu for their intelligence and help for those in need. He is regarded as "Mahan" by his assistant Chamach Singh. He is voiced by Sartaj Sarvar, in mimicry of Shatrughan Sinha. He's similar to Inspector Chingum.
 Chamach Singh is the tall assistant of Inspector Manmani. He is portrayed as smart. He is similar to Hera Pheri.
 Sher Singh is the main villain. He likes to rob banks. He wears a black shirt. He is voiced by Sartaj Sarvar in mimicry of Jeevan. He's similar to John the Don.
 Ting Tong is a Chinese man who works for Gattu and Battu and has a memory problem. He wears a white shirt. He's similar to Ghasitaram.

Recurring
 Daya is an idiot henchman of Sher Singh who helps him rob banks, He is sometimes given a Carrot by Gattu. He's similar to Number 1.
 Baya is another idito henchman of Sher Singh, helping him to rob banks. His catchphrase is "Katti Butti Boss". He's similar to Number 2.
 Beema is a strong henchman of Sher Singh. He wears a red and black shirt. He is smarter than both Daya and Baya. He is similar to Boxer.
 Dr. Bhatawadekar is a professor who works for Gattu and Battu, making inventions for them. Despite his help, his lab is filled with traps. He's similar to Dr. Jhatka and partially Chaiwala.
 Scientist Gadbadjhala is the Evil scientist who helps Sher Singh. He is similar to Dr. Virus. He appears in a few episodes.

Episodes

Films

Reception
The Gattu Battu music video garnered 2.7 million views in three weeks on YouTube.

References 

2017 Indian television series debuts
Indian children's animated comedy television series
Italian computer-animated television series
Nickelodeon (Indian TV channel) original programming
Indian Armed Forces in fiction
Hindi-language Nickelodeon original programming